The National Basketball Association (NBA) is a major professional basketball league in North America. It was founded in 1946 as the Basketball Association of America (BAA). The league adopted its current name at the start of the  when it merged with the National Basketball League (NBL). The league consists of 30 teams, of which 29 are located in the United States and one in Canada. In the NBA, a head coach is the highest ranking coach of a coaching staff. They typically hold a more public profile and are paid more than the assistant coaches.

Former Los Angeles Lakers and Chicago Bulls head coach Phil Jackson has won eleven NBA championships, the most in NBA history. He won six titles with the Chicago Bulls and five titles with the Lakers, and is the only coach who has won multiple championships with more than one team. John Kundla, Pat Riley, and current San Antonio Spurs head coach Gregg Popovich have each won five championships. Kundla won all of his titles with the Lakers, and Popovich has won all of his titles with the Spurs, while Riley won four titles with the Lakers and one with the Miami Heat. Current Golden State Warriors head coach Steve Kerr has won four championships, while current Miami Heat head coach Erik Spoelstra has won two titles. Philadelphia 76ers head coach Doc Rivers, Indiana Pacers head coach Rick Carlisle, Toronto Raptors head coach Nick Nurse, Milwaukee Bucks head coach Mike Budenholzer and Los Angeles Clippers head coach Tyronn Lue are the only other active coaches who have won a championship. Rivers won while with the Boston Celtics in 2008, Carlisle with the Dallas Mavericks in 2011, and Lue with the Cleveland Cavaliers in 2016.

Other achievements 
 Of the championship head coaches, 15 (Auerbach, Larry Brown, Carlisle, Bill Fitch, Tom Heinsohn, Red Holzman, Jackson, Kerr, Dick Motta, Nurse, Popovich, Riley, Rivers, Bill Sharman, and Lenny Wilkens) have won the Coach of the Year Award.
 14 (Auerbach, Brown, Chuck Daly, Fitch, Alex Hannum, Heinsohn, Holzman, Jackson, Kundla, Jack Ramsay, Riley, Sharman, Rudy Tomjanovich and Wilkens) have been elected to the Naismith Memorial Basketball Hall of Fame as a coach.
 14 (Jones, Russell, Heinsohn, Sharman, Jackson, Cunningham, Riley, Holzman, Costello, Senesky, Jeannette, Carlisle, Kerr, Lue) also won championships as players, with both Buddy Jeannette and Bill Russell having won their only manager titles as player-coach.
 Riley, Lue and Paul Westhead are the only three coaches who have led teams to titles having only arrived in mid-season.

Key

List

See also
 NBA Coach of the Year Award
 List of NBA champions
 List of NBA players with most championships

Notes

 Each year is linked to an article about the BAA/NBA Finals in that year.
 Each year is linked to an article about that particular BAA/NBA season.

References

Citations

Sources

List
NBA championship head coaches